The Ministry of Surface Transport was a branch of the Government of India. It was the apex body for the formulation and administration of the rules, regulations and laws relating to surface transport in India.

History
The Department of Surface Transport, within the Ministry of Transport, was renamed as the Ministry of Surface Transport with effect from 22 October 1986. The next development was that this ministry was reorganised into the Department of Shipping and the Department of Road Transport and Highways. This took place on the 15 October 1999.

The ministry was bifurcated, into the Ministry of Shipping and the Ministry of Road Transport and Highways, with effect from 17 November 2000.

List of Ministers of Surface Transport

References 

India, Surface Transport
1986 establishments in India
2000 disestablishments in India
Defunct government ministries of India
Ministries established in 1986
Ministries disestablished in 2000
Transport organisations based in India